Temporins are a family of peptides isolated originally from the skin secretion of the European red frog, Rana temporaria.  Peptides belonging to the temporin family have been isolated also from closely related North American frogs, such as Rana sphenocephala.

In elephants, temporin is secreted by temporal glands during the period of musth.  It contains proteins, lipids (notably cholesterol), phenols, cresols and sesquiterpenes (notably farnesol and its derivatives). This is not related to temporins that are antimicrobial peptides.

In old Sanskrit texts, it is referred to as rut fluid (or ) and is considered to be a symbol of potency and vigour:

However, from the point of view of ancient Indian elephant science, temporin is not a direct symptom of rut.

References 

Peptide hormones
Exocrine system